The Power Macintosh 7200 (sold as a Power Macintosh 8200 in Europe) is a personal computer designed, manufactured, and sold by Apple Computer from August 1995 to February 1997. The 90 MHz model was sold in Japan as the Power Macintosh 7215, and the 120 MHz model with bundled server software as the Apple Workgroup Server 7250. When sold as the 8200, it used the Quadra 800/Power Mac 8100's mini-tower form factor.

The 7200 was introduced alongside the Power Macintosh 7500 and 8500 at the 1995 MacWorld Expo in Boston. Apple referred to these machines collectively as the "Power Surge" line, communicating that this second generation of PowerPC machines offered a significant speed improvement over their predecessors. Introduced as a successor to the Power Macintosh 7100, the 7200 represents the low end of this generation of Power Macintosh, which replaced NuBus with PCI. It shares the 7500's "Outrigger" case. At launch, the 7200 was available with processor speeds of 75 and 90 MHz, with the slower model being replaced by a 120 MHz CPU in February 1996. The 120 MHz model was also available in a "PC compatible" variant, which came with a PCI card that allowed the computer to run Microsoft Windows and other PC operating systems. The card featured a 100 MHz Pentium processor.

The Power Macintosh 7300 replaced the 7200 in February 1997.

Upgrades 
Unlike other Power Macintosh machines of the time, the CPU is soldered to the motherboard instead of on a daughterboard. This presented a challenge for users who wanted to upgrade to a faster processor. At the time of its introduction, Apple promised an inexpensive logic board upgrade to the 7500, but due to high demand for the 7500, this never materialized. When the upgrade was finally made available, it was to the follow-on model, the Power Macintosh 7600, and came in the form of a complete logic board replacement. The base price was $1,300 and upgraded the system to a  CPU, but did not include L2 cache.

The 7200's CPU was considered otherwise impossible to upgrade until, over three years after the 7200 was discontinued, Sonnet eventually produced an G3 upgrade card for the PCI slots.

Models 

Introduced August 8, 1995:
 Power Macintosh 7200/75
 Power Macintosh 7200/90

Introduced January 11, 1996:
 Power Macintosh 7215/90

Introduced February 26, 1996:
 Workgroup Server 7250/120

Introduced April 22, 1996:
 Power Macintosh 7200/120
 Power Macintosh 7200/120 PC Compatible
 Power Macintosh 8200/100
 Power Macintosh 8200/120

References

External links 

 Official Power Macintosh 7200/120 page (1996) 7200/120 
 Official Power Macintosh 7200/120 (PC Compatible) page (1996) 7200/120 PC 

7200
7200
Macintosh desktops
Computer-related introductions in 1995